Forge is a level editor developed by Bungie and 343 Industries for the first-person shooter video game series, Halo. Forge was initially released alongside Halo 3, and was further expanded upon in Halo: Reach, Halo 4, Halo 2: Anniversary, Halo 5: Guardians, and Halo Infinite.

Upon Halo 3'''s release, Forge received critical acclaim for its ease of use and versatility. Bungie subsequently released multiple maps designed for Forge editing in both Halo 3 and Halo: Reach. As of 2019, over 6.6 million user-created maps have been created using Forge.

Function
In Halo 3, Forge is an in-game map editor designed for adjusting weapon, vehicle, and prop placement. While in Editor Mode, the player becomes a floating robot, or "monitor", who can spawn, move, and delete any game object on the map. All objects are assigned a monetary value, and cost money to spawn; the level's "Forge budget" determines how much money the player can use to spawn objects. Unlike conventional level editors, map geometry can't be moved or deleted in Halo 3 Forge, but props (such as crates and concrete barriers) can be used to create makeshift walls and blockades. Later updates to Halo 3 added DLC maps specifically designed for Forge editing, with expanded prop lists that allow players to create rudimentary maps out of blocks, slopes, and panels.

The Halo: Reach iteration of Forge received multiple new features, such as the ability to phase objects through one another, suspend objects in mid-air, and adjust object placement in finer increments through "nudging". These additions were later back-ported to Halo 3 in an update to Halo: The Master Chief Collection.

History
Development on Forge began only 6 months prior to the launch of Halo 3; according to Bungie producer Allen Murray, multiple "small UI features" had to be cut to accommodate its inclusion. Forge was first unveiled in August 2007 at the Leipzig Games Convention.Halo 5: Forge, a free standalone version of Halo 5s map editing tool, was released for Windows 10 on September 8, 2016.

In August 2019, 343 Industries transferred over 6.6 million Forge maps created on the Xbox 360 versions of Halo 3, Halo: Reach, and Halo 4 to Halo: The Master Chief Collection.

Forge was left unimplemented for the 2019 Windows release of Halo: The Master Chief Collection, but was later added with Halo 3'''s launch in July 2020. With the release of Forge on Windows, Halo 3 Forge received multiple new features back-ported from Halo: Reach.

On July 15, 2022, players enrolled in the Xbox Insider Program for Halo Infinite got access to a beta version of the game as a test flight for the upcoming co-op campaign feature. Within this build of the game, dataminers were able to access an early version of Halo Infinite's Forge and leak gameplay footage across social media sites, surprisingly to the approval of 343 Industries. Halo Infinite's Forge was released in the form of an official beta version on November 8, 2022 as part of the Winter Update.

Reception
As a component of Halo 3, Forge received critical acclaim upon its release. GameSpot Jeff Gerstmann described Forge as "an extremely powerful addition that might just take over your life", and praised the editor for the replay value it provided. Heather Campbell of Play Magazine named Halo 3 her game of the year due to Forge, with co-editor Greg Orlando explaining later in the issue: "What separates Halo 3 from other console shooters such as Call of Duty 4: Modern Warfare and Team Fortress 2, though, is the inclusion of a forge mode and the ability to save and edit gameplay films. [...] Although these modes are standard fare in most PC online shooters, their inclusion in a console game is something entirely new — and entirely wonderful." In an editorial for Edge, N'Gai Croal stated that Forge could "help prove the viability of user-generated content on consoles." Halo 3s iteration of Forge has received comparisons to Garry's Mod, a 2004 Half-Life 2 mod with a similar emphasis on free-form construction and experimentation.

Legacy
Outside of its intended use as a map editor, Forge has been used to create art installations by arranging in-game props to draw pictures and write messages. Game modes and maps created in Forge have occasionally informed the development of Halo itself. Grifball, a fictional sport that originated in the Halo-themed web series Red vs. Blue, inspired a popular user-created Forge map and game mode styled after rugby. Grifball was developed into an official weekly playlist for Halo 3, and would go on to be included in every subsequent Halo game after Halo: Reach.

343 Industries employee Nick Bird, working as Forge Quality Assurance on Halo Infinite, credited Forge for his interest in game development; "My time in Forge and the Forge community eventually led me to pursue a career in the industry, and ultimately landed me a position to work on what I love in a franchise I love."

In September 2021, the developers of the first-person portal-based shooter Splitgate announced that they intend to incorporate their proprietary version of a Forge mode into the game, which launched before the long-delayed Halo Infinite released its version.

References

Halo (franchise)
Video game level editors